Soul in Love is the fourth studio album and second cover album by Filipino singer Jay R, released in January 2008 by Universal Records. The album showcases his vocal quality and range, singing classical R&B and jazz songs that he grew up listening to, like "After the Love Has Gone", "Always and Forever" and "Ain't No Sunshine". It received highly positive reviews from OPM critics, and won numerous awards for his outstanding vocal performance. It has also helped Jay R gain a new audience and fans.

The album was made available on digital download through iTunes and Amazon.com on April 1, 2008. To date, it has been certified Platinum by the Philippine Association of the Record Industry for selling more than 30,000 units in the Philippines.

Release and promotion
Initially, Soul in Love had no promotion. It was until it reached Gold certification that Jay R started promoting the album. He did concerts, mall shows, gigs and TV guestings to advertise the album. He did a Soul in Love Mall Tour on July 4, 2008, performing on malls like Megamall. On July 10, 2008, he went to Japan to further increase in sales and popularity. He also did numerous TV guestings, including one on MYX Live!, where he performed the album's tracks—which include Anita Baker's classic hit "Sweet Love", Quincy Jones' "One Hundred Ways", Heatwave's classic ballad "Always and Forever", and Joe's pop hit "No One Else Comes Close". The episode aired on July 16, 2008, and was hosted by Jett Pangan. On August 1, 2008 (after the album has reached Gold), Soul in Love had its album launch at Eastwood City, Libis. Also in August 2008, he guested on SiS, performing "No One Else Comes Close".

Singles
"Tattooed on My Mind" was released early in 2008 as the album's first single. It features D'Sound, the band who originally recorded and released the song, becoming their most popular and biggest single. Jay R sang the song as a duet with the band's vocalist. The music video also features the band, and only shows footage from the recording sessions of the song. It was shot in 2006 during D'Sound's Philippine Tour, promoting their album My Today. The single charted on both music video and radio charts, but did not perform as well as Jay R's past releases. "No One Else Comes Close", originally recorded by American R&B singer Joe, was released in the summer of 2008 as a radio-only single. It received positive reception and became a favorite on radio stations.

Reception

Commercial performance
Soul in Love has received the highest ratings among Jay R albums, and has even sold impressively, remaking the commercial success that was achieved by his debut album, Gameface. On July 13, 2008, the album was certified gold by the PARI for selling above 15,000 copies in the Philippines. Its awarding was held on GMA-7's TV musical variety show, SOP. Before the album was launched in August 2008, it was already certified gold. Early in 2009, the album reached Platinum status by the PARI, selling over 30,000 units in the country.

Critical response
Not only did the album sell well, but it also received overwhelming positive reviews by OPM critics. Lorelie Dino of Titik Pilipino gave the album a perfect rating of five out of five stars, saying "As everybody should be well aware of by now, Jay R is a very talented artist". She added "He is not just a typical Fil-Am boy, but someone you’d take much pleasure in listening to and be entertained by". She listed her ten most favorite tracks from the album, explaining "I’ll only list down my top 10, otherwise I’d end up enumerating all the tracks". The list includes "Tender Love", "No One Else Comes Close", and "Two Occasions" as her top three. The review ended up with Dino, stating "Soul in Love is definitely a must-have collection".

The album has earned Jay R numerous awards and nominations on musical events. On the fourth Philippine Hip-Hop Awards held at One Ayala, Intercontinental Manila in 2008, he won the R&B Artist of the Year award for the first time, succeeding previous title holder, Nina. On the ASAP 24K Awards 2008, the album was given a recognition for certifying gold by the PARI. On the first ever Wave 89.1 Urban Music Awards in 2009, he was nominated on four categories including Best Male Soul/R&B Artist and Best Remake for "Tattooed on My Mind" with D'Sound. However, he lost Best Male to Marcus Davis and Best Remake to Thor and Amber's "Spend My Life with You". On the 2009 ASAP Platinum Circle, the album was recognized for reaching Platinum status. Unfortunately, GMA-7 did not allow the singer to attend the event of their rival TV station.

Track listing
All tracks were produced by Ito Rapadas.

Personnel
 Arnold Buena - arranger
 Barbi Chan - grooming
 Kathleen Dy-Go - executive producer
 Fred Garcia - arranger, piano
 Gil Losenada - instrumental tracks recording
 Mister Eazy - drums
 Edward Picache - saxophone, flute
 Janno Queyquep - guitar tracks
 Ito Rapadas - album producer, mixing and digital mastering, arranger
 Jay'C Rivera - album design
 Rickson Ruiz - drums
 Ronnie Salvacion - photography
 Jay R Sillona - lead vocals, back-up vocals
 Dante Tanedo - instrumental tracks recording, mixing and digital mastering
 Bobby Velasco - arranger
 Willy Villa - instrumental tracks recording, mixing and digital mastering
Soundstrite Studio (Makati, Philippines) - drums and vocals recording (track 18)
U.R. Recording Studio (Quezon City, Philippines) - instrumental tracks recording, mixing and digital mastering

Certifications

Release history

References

2008 albums
Covers albums
Jay R Sillona albums